Computer Shopper could refer to the following publications:

 Computer Shopper (UK magazine) (1988-present), a home computer magazine published in the United Kingdom
 Computer Shopper (US magazine) (1979–2009), a home computer magazine published in the United States